Buolhasan (also Romanized as Būolḩasan; also known as Abū ol Ḩasan, Bolḩasan, and Qarīyeh Abū ol Ḩasan) is a village in Arkavazi Rural District, Chavar District, Ilam County, Ilam Province, Iran. At the 2006 census, its population was 16, in 4 families. The village is populated by Kurds.

References 

Populated places in Ilam County
Kurdish settlements in Ilam Province